Eremophila daddii is a flowering plant in the figwort family, Scrophulariaceae and is endemic to Western Australia. It is a large shrub with sticky branches, hairy leaves and brown and cream-coloured flowers blotched with purple.

Description
The four stamens extend beyond the end of the petal tube. Flowering time is mainly from June to September.

Taxonomy and naming
Eremophila daddii was first formally described by Bevan Buirchell and Andrew Brown in 2016 and the description was published in Nuytsia. The specific epithet (daddii) honours Ronald James Dadd of Goomalling who discovered this species.

Distribution and habitat
This eremophila is only known from a single population near Wiluna in the Gascoyne and Murchison biogeographic regions growing near granite outcrops and eroded hillsides with Acacia and other Eremophila species.

Conservation status
Eremophila daddii has been classified as "Priority One" by the Government of Western Australia Department of Parks and Wildlife, meaning that it is known from only one or a few locations which are potentially at risk.

References

daddii
Eudicots of Western Australia
Plants described in 2016
Taxa named by Bevan Buirchell
Taxa named by Andrew Phillip Brown